The women's individual all-around gymnastics event at the 2017 Summer Universiade from August 27 to 28 at the Taipei Nangang Exhibition Center, Hall 1, 4F in Taipei, Taiwan.

Final results

References 

Women's individual all-around